Beaver Creek is a  tributary of the South Platte River in Colorado.  The creek flows from a source in Elbert County to a confluence with the South Platte in Morgan County near Hillrose.

See also
List of rivers of Colorado

References

Rivers of Colorado
Rivers of Elbert County, Colorado
Rivers of Arapahoe County, Colorado
Rivers of Washington County, Colorado
Rivers of Morgan County, Colorado
Tributaries of the Platte River

nl:Beaver Creek (Colorado)